Klaus Hemmerle (April 3, 1929 in Freiburg im Breisgau – January 23, 1994 in Aachen) was a Roman Catholic bishop in Aachen, Germany. He was ordained as a priest in 1952 and became bishop of the Diocese of Aachen in 1975. He was inspired by Chiara Lubich, who said she was also inspired by him and considered him one of the co-founders of the Focolare Movement due to his teachings on theology and philosophy, and particularly his views on plural thinking and unity.

References

Additional sources

Wilfried Hagemann: Verliebt in Gottes Wort. Leben, Denken und Wirken von Klaus Hemmerle, Bischof von Aachen. Würzburg, Echter, 2008. 
Thorsten Obst: Das Heilige und das Denken. Untersuchungen zur Phänomenologie des Heiligen bei Klaus Hammerle. Würzburg, Echter, 2010.

External links

Roman Catholic bishops of Aachen
20th-century German Roman Catholic bishops
1929 births
1994 deaths
20th-century German Roman Catholic priests